The Hellenic Basketball Association (HEBA), is a governing body for the sport of basketball in Greece. In Greek, it is officially known as the Ελληνικός Σύνδεσμος Ανωνύμων Καλαθοσφαιρικών Εταιρειών (ΕΣΑΚΕ) (LA: Ellinikós Sýndesmos Anonýmon Kalathosfairikón Etaireión (ESAKE)), which means, the Hellenic Association of Limited Basketball Companies in English.

The HEBA organizes and directs the Greek Basket League, which is Greece's top-tier level professional competition of basketball, that is contested by sports clubs. HEBA has been in charge of the top-tier level professional club basketball league in Greece, since the 1992–93 basketball season, when it took over those duties from the Hellenic Basketball Federation (EOK).

The HEBA also oversees the organization of the Greek Super Cup, the HEBA Greek All-Star Game, and the HEBA Hall of Fame. The HEBA is also a member of the Union of European Leagues of Basketball (ULEB).

Logo 
A new logo was presented in 2010, which replaced the older HEBA logo.

See also
 Greek Basket League
 Greek Super Cup
 HEBA Greek All-Star Game
 Greek Basket League Hall of Fame

References

External links
 Official ESAKE (HEBA) Site 
 ESAKE (HEBA) Site Live Match Center

Basketball in Greece
Basketball governing bodies in Europe
Greek Basket League
Bas
Sports organizations established in 1992